Iolana is a Palearctic genus of butterfly in the family Lycaenidae.

Species include:
 Iolana iolas Ochsenheimer, 1816 iolas blue
Iolana iolas iolas Ochsenheimer, 1816 North Africa, South Europe, Asia Minor
Iolana iolas lessei (Bernardi, 1964) Armenia.
Iolana iolas debiliata (Schultz, 1905) or Iolana debilitata (Schultz, 1905)  Morocco and Algeria
 Iolana alfierii Wiltshire, 1948 Egypt
 Iolana andreasi (Sheljuzhko, 1919) Iran
 Iolana gigantea (Grum-Grshimailo, 1885) Afghanistan and Pakistan.

References

Bridges, C. A. 1994. Catalogue of the Family-Group, Genus-Group and Species-Group Names of the Riodinidae & Lycaenidae (Lepidoptera) of the World. Bridges, Urbana, Illinois.

 
Lycaenidae genera